Chris Pierson is a computer game designer as well as an author of several books in the Dragonlance saga. He has written many books for the series.

Career
Chris Pierson was born in Canada.

Chris first wanted to write novels for the Dragonlance saga at the age of 12, which is when he first picked up a copy of a Dragonlance book. He finished his first novel at 16, which he describes as dreadful.  He received his big break when Margaret Weis (one of the most prestigious authors in the Dragonlance series) sent out an open call for submissions to an online site. The submissions, if accepted, would be used in an anthology of sorts. Chris had his first story accepted.

At the 1997 Gen Con game fair, TSR approached him about writing books for the Dragonlance series. He wrote the Kingpriest Trilogy and the Taladas Trilogy. His other Dragonlance novels are the Bridges of Time novels Spirit of the Wind and Dezra's Quest.

As a computer game designer, Chris Pierson was one of four systems designers for the early MMORPG fantasy game Asheron's Call. Pierson worked as a writer and designer on The Lord of the Rings Online.

Pierson's short fiction has appeared in the anthologies Time Twisters, Pandora's Closet, Fellowship Fantastic, The Dimension Next Door, and Terribly Twisted Tales.

Pierson lives in Boston, Massachusetts with his wife Rebekah and their children.

Dragonlance novels

Bridges of Time series
 Spirit of the Wind
 Dezra's Quest

The Kingpriest Trilogy
 Chosen of the Gods
 Divine Hammer
 Sacred Fire

The Taladas Trilogy
 Blades of the Tiger
 Trail of the Black Wyrm
 Shadow of the Flame

References

External links
 
 
 

20th-century American male writers
20th-century American novelists
21st-century American male writers
21st-century American novelists
American fantasy writers
American male novelists
Living people
Year of birth missing (living people)